Temuka Oval (also known as the Temuka Domain) is a cricket ground in Temuka, Canterbury, New Zealand.  The first recorded match held on the ground came in 1905 when South Canterbury played North Otago.  The ground later held a single first-class match in 1978 when Young New Zealand played a touring England XI, which resulted in an innings and 23 run victory for the England XI.

The oval was scheduled to hold a concert as part of Tina Turner's Wildest Dreams Tour on 19 April 1997, but this was cancelled.

References

External links
Temuka Oval at ESPNcricinfo
Temuka Oval at CricketArchive

Cricket grounds in New Zealand
Sports venues in Canterbury, New Zealand